Food is a substance that can be consumed by organisms, especially by eating, in order to sustain life. It generally provides nutrition and acts as a fuel for the working of a body.

Food may also refer to:

Films
 Food (film) (1992), animated short film by Jan Švankmajer
 Food, Inc. (2009), documentary

Music
 Food (band), a jazz band initiated by Ian Bellamy and Thomas Strønen
 F.O.O.D. (album), (2005), by Danny!
 Food (Kelis album) (2014)
 Food (Zico Chain album) (2007)
 The Food Album (1993), by "Weird Al" Yankovic
 "The Food" (2004), a song by Common
 Food Records, a British record label

Other uses
 FOOD, 1970s artist-run restaurant in SoHo, New York
 "Food", the 2nd episode of the Adult Swim television series, Off the Air
 Foods (journal)
 Foodstuffs (company), a New Zealand company